Joseph Kirby Corson (22 November 1836 – 24 July 1913) was an American soldier who fought in the American Civil War. Corson received the country's highest award for bravery during combat, the Medal of Honor, for his action near Bristoe Station in Virginia on 14 October 1863. He was honored with the award on 13 May 1899.

Early life
Corson was born in Plymouth Meeting in Pennsylvania on 22 November 1836, the second of nine children of Hiram and Ann Jones Foulke Corson. His father, a doctor, was well off enough to provide a tutor for Corson's education before the latter became a student of the Treemount Seminary in nearby Norristown. He moved to Philadelphia in 1856 to become an apprentice at a drugstore while attending the Philadelphia College of Pharmacy, from which he graduated with a PhG in 1858. Corson moved to St. Paul, Minnesota to work with a pharmacist, but the business quickly failed and Corson returned to Norristown to become a partner in a cousin's lime business, and soon enrolled at the medical school of the University of Pennsylvania.

American Civil War 
The beginning of the American Civil War interrupted Corson's education as he enlisted in Company K of the 4th Pennsylvania Infantry in April 1861, and mustered out as a sergeant in July 1861. Returning to Penn late that year, he served as a medical cadet at the army hospital on Cherry and Broad Streets while studying at the school. He enlisted in the 6th Pennsylvania Reserves (35th Pennsylvania Volunteers) as an assistant surgeon in March 1863 after graduating with an MD degree, participating in the Battles of Gettysburg, Falling Waters, Manassas Gap, Bristoe Station, Mine Run, Rappahannock Station, the Wilderness, Spotsylvania, North Anna, and Bethesda Church. Brevetted major for distinguishing himself in the Wilderness, Corson mustered out again in June 1864. At Bristoe Station on 14 October, Corson and a hospital attendant rescued a severely wounded soldier left between the lines while under Confederate artillery fire. For this action, he was awarded the Medal of Honor on 13 May 1899. In November 1864, he became medical officer at Camp Discharge, used to muster out soldiers, in Philadelphia.

Later life 
After the end of the war, Corson mustered out in May 1865 and returned to Plymouth Meeting to join his father's practice. Corson was appointed as assistant surgeon to the regular army in October 1867. He was promoted to major in November 1888, and retired in November 1897. 
He was a companion of the Pensylvania Commandery of the Military Order of the Loyal Legion of the United States.

He died on 24 July 1913 and his remains are interred at the West Laurel Hill Cemetery, Bryn Mawr section, Lot 98, in Bala Cynwyd, Pennsylvania.

Medal of Honor citation

See also

List of American Civil War Medal of Honor recipients: A–F

References

Citations

Bibliography 

 

1836 births
1913 deaths
People of Pennsylvania in the American Civil War
Union Army officers
United States Army Medal of Honor recipients
American Civil War recipients of the Medal of Honor
Burials at West Laurel Hill Cemetery